Boluo County is a county of east-central Guangdong province, People's Republic of China. It borders Yuancheng District, Dongyuan and Zijin counties to the northeast, Huiyang and Huicheng Districts to the southeast, Dongguan to the south, Zengcheng to the west, and Longmen County to the northwest.

History
In Lüshi Chunqiu, the current Boluo used to be one of the many Yue states without a king before Qin dynasty. The current Boluo is derived from the same old Yue word and therefore means "people in mountain".

In 214 BCE after the unification of China by Qin, Fuluo County (傅羅縣) was established. Its name was altered to Boluo under the Emperor Wu of Jin's rule in 280 CE.

Administrative divisions
Boluo administers 17 towns:

Economy
Boluo County is said to be the home to the country's largest farm for raising the rare "Golden coin turtle" Cuora trifasciata.

Transport
Guangzhou–Huizhou and  intersect within the county, and China National Highways 205 and 324 as well as the Beijing–Kowloon and Guangzhou–Meizhou–Shantou railways traverse the entire county.

Climate

Notes

 
County-level divisions of Guangdong
Huizhou